A. F. Hileman (1851-1898) was a North Carolina politician who holds a unique place in the history of the state as the only member of a third party, in this case the People's Party (or Populists), to serve as Speaker of the North Carolina House of Representatives (at least in the post-Civil War two-party system).

Hileman represented Cabarrus County, North Carolina in the House in the 1891, 1895, and 1897 sessions. In 1897, he was elected Speaker of the House by a fusion of Republicans and Populists that won a majority in the 1896 elections that also brought to power Gov. Daniel L. Russell and Lt. Gov. Charles A. Reynolds (both Republicans). The "fusionists" lost the controversial 1898 legislative elections to the Democrats.

References

1851 births
1898 deaths
Members of the North Carolina House of Representatives
North Carolina Populists
Speakers of the North Carolina House of Representatives
19th-century American politicians